Nick Moore is a film director and editor. He directed the 2011 British Movie Horrid Henry: The Movie. He directed the 2008 Wild Child, and other previous work included editing the 1997 The Full Monty for which he was nominated for a BAFTA award, the 1999 hit  Notting Hill, the 2002 About a Boy for which he was nominated for the American Cinema Editors Award for Best Edited Feature Film – Comedy or Musical, and the 2003 Love Actually.

Filmography

Director
 2008: Wild Child
 2011: Horrid Henry: The Movie
 2014: Pudsey: The Movie

Editor
 1983: Never Say Never Again
 1987: Empire of the Sun
 1989: Indiana Jones and the Last Crusade
 1990: Spies Inc.
 1990: Memphis Belle
 1991: Meeting Venus
 1992: Orlando
 1993: Little Buddha
 1994: A Business Affair
 1994: Mary Shelley's Frankenstein
 1996: Mission: Impossible
 1997: The Full Monty
 1998: The Land Girls
 1998: Divorcing Jack
 1999: Notting Hill
 2000: Beautiful Joe
 2001: What's the Worst That Could Happen?
 2001: Ghost World
 2001: All the Queen's Men
 2002: About a Boy
 2003: Love Actually
 2004: Along Came Polly
 2004: Christmas with the Kranks
 2005: Nanny McPhee
 2006: Freedomland
 2006: Little Man
 2007: Meet Bill
 2008: Last Chance Harvey
 2010: Leap Year
 2010: Morning Glory
 2012: Mirror Mirror
 2013: Enough Said
 2014: Finding Fanny
 2014: She's Funny That Way
 2015: Jenny's Wedding
 2015: Burnt
 2016: Bridget Jones's Baby
 2017: The Ottoman Lieutenant
 2018: Patrick
 2018: King of Thieves

References

External links

Living people
British film directors
British film editors
Place of birth missing (living people)
Year of birth missing (living people)